The Antipodes parakeet or Antipodes Island parakeet (Cyanoramphus unicolor) is a parrot in the family Psittaculidae that is endemic to the Antipodes Islands of New Zealand. It is one of two parrot species found on the islands, and one of only five ground-dwelling parrots in the world. They are long-living birds that may live up to 10 years of age, but the introduction of mice that compete with them for food is a threat to their survival on the Antipodes Islands. Unusually for parrots, they sometimes prey upon other birds, a trait shared by another New Zealand parrot, the kea.

Taxonomy
The Antipodes parakeet was depicted in 1831 by the English artist Edward Lear in his Illustrations of the Family of Psittacidae, or Parrots. Lear used the common name "Uniform parakeet" and coined the binomial name Platycercus unicolor. The species is now placed in the genus Cyanoramphus that was introduced in 1854 by the French ornithologist Charles Lucien Bonaparte.

Its closest relative is Reischek's parakeet, which also lives on the Antipodes Islands. Other relatives include the Norfolk parakeet, Society parakeet and Chatham parakeet.

Description
It is the largest species in the genus Cyanoramphus at 30 cm (12 in) long. and makes a penetrating kok-kok-kok-kok noise.

Distribution and habitat
The Antipodes parakeet is endemic to the Antipodes Islands of New Zealand. They are common on the main Antipodes Island, but are less common on smaller islands in the group such as Bollons Island. They live in very small numbers on Leeward Island, where they only live in a 0.1 square kilometre region of the island. The Antipodes parakeet also live on the 0.1 square kilometre Archway Island as well.

Behaviour and ecology
These parakeets eat leaves, buds, grass, and tussock stalks, as well as sometimes feeding on seeds, flowers, and will scavenge dead seabirds. The Antipodes parakeet also preys on grey-backed storm petrels, entering burrows to kill incubating adults, even digging at the entrance if it is too small.

Antipodes parakeets spend much of their time on the ground and in very small groups, in pairs or solitary.

They are quite inquisitive, territorial, probing and mischievous.

Their nest is in a tunnel 2 metres beneath the fibrous peat away from the wind.

Status
The population is stable but conservation status is Vulnerable. The population is 2,000-3,000.
Originally entirely restricted to the islands that bear their name there is now a small captive population, founded with less than 20 individuals, on the mainland.

References

External links

World Parrot Trust Parrot Encyclopedia - Species Profile
 BirdLife Species Factsheet.
ARKive - images and movies of the Antipodes Parakeet (Cyanoramphus unicolor)
Antipodes Parakeet TerraNature | New Zealand ecology

Antipodes parakeet
Birds of the Antipodes Islands
Endemic birds of New Zealand
Parrots of Oceania
Antipodes parakeet
Taxa named by Edward Lear